The Cones Hotline was a telephone hotline introduced by the Prime Minister of the United Kingdom John Major in June 1992 to allow members of the public to enquire about roadworks on the country's roads and report areas where traffic cones had been deployed on a road for no apparent reason. The telephone number for the hotline (originally 0345 504030, later 08457 504030) was usually displayed on signs after sections of roadworks.

The hotline was widely seen as being a waste of government resources, costing several thousand pounds per year to run. In September 1995, having fielded a total of fewer than twenty thousand calls, it was announced that the hotline would be gradually wound down.

The hotline continued after this date, with a broader remit, and renamed as the 'Highways Agency Information Line' or HAIL. The Highways Agency was another of Major's innovations, having been formed not long before, in 1994. The hotline was one of the first to move to the new local-rate 0845 numbers in 1996. In 2010, the Highways Agency announced the two year phase out of the 0845 number in favour of a new number, 0300 1235000. The change was to take advantage of cost savings offered by 0300 numbers. For callers, the 0300 number was treated the same as a typical geographic phone number (starting with 01 or 02) in pricing schemes by all phone companies, including mobile phones. Under the 0845 number, some charged extra to call the number. Additionally, Highways England's per minute fee on each call was now capped at 5p.

References

Streetworks
Telecommunications-related introductions in 1992